Abijah McCall was a co-inventor of the Fresno Scraper, a horse-drawn (and later, tractor-drawn) earth-moving machine upon which modern road- and canal-building equipment is based. Along with his partner Frank Dusy, McCall devised an improvement on the Buck Scraper, invented by James Porteous. On June 15, 1885, McCall and Dusy received U.S. Patent 320,055 for their version of the scraper. Porteous purchased the patents held by Dusy and McCall and also a patent held by William Deidrick as he perfected the scraper, which Porteous also  manufactured at his factory in Fresno, California. The scraper was widely used in the Western United States and also put into use by U.S. engineers building the Panama Canal. Deidrick, Dusy, and McCall were all early residents of Selma, California, where McCall Avenue is named for McCall. McCall reputedly used a Fresno Scraper in building the road which runs through Selma and north to Clovis, California.

References

 Haddock, Keith. Earthmoving Machinery. St. Paul, Minn.: MBI Publishing Company, 1998. 
 Lay, M.G. Ways of the World: A History of the World's Roads and the Vehicles that Used Them. New Brunswick, N.J.: Rutgers University Press, 1992. 
 McFarland, J. Randall Centennial Selma: Biography of a California Community's First 100 Years. Selma, Calif.: McFarland/Selma Enterprise, 1980.  ASIN B0006E22C4
 McFarland, J. Randall, "Water for a Thirsty Land -- The Consolidated Irrigation District and Its Canal Development History", Selma, Calif.: Consolidated Irrigation District, 1996.

External links
 Bell, Diana. Speech to 1997 ASHGR Convention
 Fresno Historical Society. James Porteous papers

Engineers from California
19th-century American inventors
Year of birth missing
Year of death missing
People from Selma, California